Nicolas Pépé (born 29 May 1995) is a professional footballer who plays as a winger for  club Nice, on loan from Arsenal of the . Born in France, he represents the Ivory Coast national team.

Pépé began his senior club career with Poitiers in the Championnat de France Amateur 2. He signed for Angers in 2013, aged 18, and spent a season on loan at Orléans in 2015. He signed for Lille in 2017, and was named to the UNFP Ligue 1 Team of the Year in the 2018–19 season. That summer, Pépé joined Arsenal for a club-record fee of £72 million, and won the FA Cup in his debut season.

Pépé, who was born in France to parents of Ivorian descent, made his debut for the Ivory Coast on 15 November 2016 in a friendly against France. He was selected for the Africa Cup of Nations in 2017, 2019 and 2021.

Club career

Poitiers
Pépé was born in Mantes-la-Jolie, Île-de-France. He started his career originally playing as a goalkeeper for local side Solitaire Paris Est until he was 14 years old. When his father Celestin, a prison guard, was transferred to Poitiers, Pépé began his senior career as an outfield player with Poitiers FC in the Championnat de France Amateur 2 (fifth tier) in 2012–13.

Angers
Pépé signed for Angers in 2013, and spent his first season with the reserves in the CFA 2.

He made his professional debut in the second round of the Coupe de la Ligue in a 2–1 home loss to Arles-Avignon on 26 August 2014, as a 73rd-minute substitute for Yohann Eudeline. His first Ligue 2 match was on 21 November 2014, starting in a 1–1 Ligue 2 draw away to Ajaccio.

Orléans (loan)
Pépé was loaned to Orléans for the 2015–16 Championnat National, and helped the club to promotion from the third tier as runners-up. He returned to an Angers side playing in Ligue 1 and which reached the 2017 Coupe de France Final, where he started in a 1–0 loss to Paris Saint-Germain at the Stade de France.

Lille
On 21 June 2017, Pépé signed a five-year deal with Lille, for a maximum transfer fee of €10 million, after being signed by head coach Marcelo Bielsa who had scouted the player by watching footage of every Ligue 1 game he had played in for Angers, before scouting him in person. Pépé described Bielsa as "special" and a "great coach". He started the season playing as a striker after being converted into playing the position under Bielsa, before finishing the season under the new Lille head coach Christophe Galtier, playing as a winger.

During the entirety of the 2017–18 Ligue 1 season, he was a regular in a Lille side that narrowly avoided relegation, missing only two games and scoring 13 times, including two apiece in away wins at Metz and Toulouse.

On 15 September 2018, during the 2018–19 Ligue 1 season, Pépé scored a hat-trick, including two penalties, in the 3–2 away win over Amiens. Days later, it was confirmed by club president Gérard Lopez that Barcelona were among several clubs that were interested in signing him. On 14 April 2019, Pépé scored a goal and provided two assists in the 5–1 home win over Paris Saint-Germain. He finished the 2018–19 Ligue 1 season with 22 goals, second only to PSG's Kylian Mbappé, with 11 assists, and was named in the UNFP Team of the Year.

Arsenal
On 1 August 2019, it was announced that Pépé had joined Premier League club Arsenal in a club-record fee of €79 million (£72 million), eclipsing the previous record of €62 million for Pierre-Emerick Aubameyang. Upon signing for Arsenal, he was handed the number 19 shirt.

Pépé made his Arsenal debut in a 1–0 away win over Newcastle United on 11 August, as a substitute for Reiss Nelson in the 71st minute. His first start for the club came two weeks later in a 3–1 loss to Liverpool, in which he played the full 90 minutes. He scored his first Arsenal goal, from the penalty spot, in the team's 3–2 home win over Aston Villa on 22 September. He scored his first European goals in Arsenal's UEFA Europa League 3–2 home win over Vitória de Guimarães on 24 October, two free-kicks.

On 1 January 2020, Pépé scored Arsenal's first goal in a 2–0 home victory over Manchester United, marking new head-coach Mikel Arteta's first win. On 16 February, Pépé scored once and assisted twice in a 4–0 win over Newcastle United. On 28 June, he scored his first FA Cup goal in a 2–1 away win against Sheffield United in the quarter-finals, giving Arsenal the lead in the 25th minute from the penalty spot. On 1 August, he played the whole 90 minutes of the FA Cup Final match against Chelsea to win his first club trophy as an Arsenal player, contributing the assist for Aubameyang's second goal.

On 22 November 2020, Pépé received the first red card of his career in a 0–0 away draw against Leeds United after clashing heads with Ezgjan Alioski in the 51st minute. On 2 February 2021, he beat two defenders before scoring in a game against Wolverhampton Wanderers; that goal was later voted as Goal of the Month for February on Arsenal's official website.

On 24 February 2022, Pépé scored his first goal of the 2021–22 Premier League season in a 2–1 win against Wolverhampton with an 82nd-minute strike, and was instrumental in the buildup of forcing an own goal in the 95th minute to cap a late comeback.

Nice (loan)
On 25 August 2022, Pépé joined Ligue 1 club Nice on loan for the remainder of the 2022–23 season without an option to buy.

International career
Pépé was born in France to parents of Ivorian descent. He received a call up to the Ivory Coast national team in November 2016, and was an unused substitute in the goalless draw away to Morocco in 2018 FIFA World Cup qualification on 12 November. He made his debut three days later in a friendly of the same score against his birth nation, France, at the Stade Bollaert-Delelis in Lens, playing the final four minutes in place of Max-Alain Gradel.

Pépé was named in Michel Dussuyer's 23-man squad for the 2017 Africa Cup of Nations in Gabon, but took no part as the Elephants were eliminated from their group.

On 24 March 2018, in a friendly against Togo in France, Pépé scored his first international goals in the first half of a 2–2 draw. He followed it three days later, with another goal in a 2–1 win against Moldova in the same stadium.

Pépé was called up for the 2019 Africa Cup of Nations in Egypt. He was absent from their quarter-final penalty shootout defeat by Algeria, having been dropped for Max Alain Gradel due to a lack of form.

Style of play
Pépé is known as a quick and skilled attacking winger who is comfortable on both flanks, but usually plays on the right wing cutting onto his left foot; he was also converted from playing in wide positions by former Lille head coach Marcelo Bielsa to play as a striker on either the inside or central channel.

Media
Pépé was involved in the Amazon Original sports docuseries All or Nothing: Arsenal, which documented the club by spending time with the coaching staff and players behind the scenes both on and off the field throughout their 2021–22 season.

Career statistics

Club

International

Scores and results list Ivory Coast's goal tally first, score column indicates score after each Pépé goal

Honours
Arsenal
 FA Cup: 2019–20

Individual
 UNFP Ligue 1 Team of the Year: 2018–19
 UNFP Ligue 1 Player of the Month: September 2018, January 2019
 Prix Marc-Vivien Foé: 2019
 Lille Player of the Season: 2018–19
 UEFA Europa League Squad of the Season: 2020–21

References

External links

 Profile at the Arsenal F.C. website
 
 

1995 births
Living people
People from Mantes-la-Jolie
Footballers from Yvelines
French footballers
Ivorian footballers
Association football wingers
Stade Poitevin FC players
Angers SCO players
US Orléans players
Lille OSC players
Arsenal F.C. players
OGC Nice players
Ligue 2 players
Championnat National players
Ligue 1 players
Premier League players
FA Cup Final players
Ivory Coast international footballers
2017 Africa Cup of Nations players
2019 Africa Cup of Nations players
2021 Africa Cup of Nations players
French expatriate footballers
Ivorian expatriate footballers
Expatriate footballers in England
French expatriate sportspeople in England
Ivorian expatriate sportspeople in England
French sportspeople of Ivorian descent